Akram, is a given name and surname, derived from the Arabic root word Karam, meaning generosity. In the Arabic language, Akram is a comparative adjective and means "kinder." In Turkey and Eastern Europe, the name is also rendered as Ekrem/Eqrem. Notable people with the name include:

Given name
 Akram Afif, Qatari footballer
 Akram Aldroubi, American mathematician
 Akram Monfared Arya, Iranian pilot
 Akram Chehayeb, Lebanese politician
 Akram al-Hawrani, Syrian politician
 Akram Khan (cricketer), Bangladeshi cricketer
 Akram Khan (dancer), English dancer of Bangladeshi descent
 Akram Fouad Khater, Lebanese-American historian
 Akram Khpalwak, Governor of Paktika Province in Afghanistan
 Akram Khuzam, al-Jazeera journalist
 Akram Mahinan, Malaysian footballer
 Akram Mohammadi, Iranian actress
 Akram Ojjeh, Saudi businessman
 Akram Pahalwan, Pakistani wrestler
 Akram El Hadi Salim, Sudanese footballer
 Akram Shammaa, Syrian politician
 Akram Umarov, Kyrgyzstani footballer
 Akram Yurabayev, Uzbekistani sprint canoer
 Akram Zaki, Pakistani Senator and literary scholar
 Akram uz-Zaman, Bengali politician and member of the Meghalaya Legislative Assembly

Surname
 Ahmed Akram, Egyptian swimmer
 Barmak Akram, Afghani filmmaker
 Hajaz Akram, British actor
 Malik Faisal Akram (1977–2022), perpetrator of the Colleyville synagogue hostage crisis
 Nashat Akram (born 1984), Iraqi football player
 Nawaal Akram, Qatari comedian
 Omar Akram, American pianist
 Wasim Akram (born 1966), Pakistani cricketer

References

Arabic-language surnames
Arabic masculine given names